William Francis Romain (born 1948) is an American archaeologist, archaeoastronomer, and author. William Romain received his Ph.D. in archaeology from the University of Leicester and M.A. and B.A. degrees in anthropology from Kent State University.  He specializes in the study of ancient religions, cognitive archaeology, and archaeoastronomy. He is a Research Associate with the Indiana University, Museum of Archaeology and Anthropology, and serves on the editorial board of the Midcontinental Journal of Archaeology.  He is a Fellow of the Royal Geographical Society and The Explorers Club. Romain is a past advisor to the Board of Trustees for the Heartland Earthworks Conservancy, past Research Associate with the Newark Earthworks Center at Ohio State University and recipient of the Archaeological Society of Ohio's Robert Converse award for Outstanding Contributions to Ohio Archaeology. William Romain is a licensed private pilot (fixed wing aircraft) and holds certification in marine celestial navigation. He has conducted archaeoastronomic fieldwork in the Eastern United States, China, Inner Mongolia, Tibet, Thailand, Cambodia, and Myanmar (Burma). In 2011 Romain led a team of archaeologists  (The Serpent Mound Project) in an investigation of Serpent Mound, in Adams County, Ohio. This was the first major investigation of the effigy in more than one hundred years and included Geoprobe coring, hand coring, limited excavation, ground-penetrating radar, and electric resistivity analysis. Among the results were new radiocarbon dates for the effigy suggesting it was built about 2,300 years ago by people of the Early Woodland period. Other work has included  archaeoastronomic findings for Poverty Point and Watson Brake in Louisiana, Mound City in Ohio, the Newark Earthworks and Great Hopewell Road in Ohio, and Cahokia in Illinois.  Most recently William Romain has published new archaeoastronomic findings for Angkor Wat in Cambodia, the Great Ziggurat of Ur in Iraq, Xanadu in Inner Mongolia, and the Jokhang, Samye, and Tradruk temples in Tibet.

Books 

 An Archaeology of the Sacred: Adena-Hopewell Astronomy and Landscape Archaeology (The Ancient Earthworks Project, 2015) 
 Shamans of the Lost World: A Cognitive Approach to the Prehistoric Religion of the Ohio Hopewell (AltaMira Press, 2009)
 Mysteries of the Hopewell: Astronomers, Geometers, and Magicians of the Eastern Woodlands (University of Akron Press, 2000)

References 

American archaeologists
1948 births
Living people